Multan is a city in the Punjab province of Pakistan. Multan may also refer to :

Places

Pakistan 
 Multan City, a city in the Punjab province of Pakistan
Multan District, a district in Punjab, Pakistan encompassing the city of Multan and surrounding areas
 Multan Division, an administrative division in Punjab
 Multan Cantt, a military cantonment in Multan
Subah of Multan, a Mughal imperial province in Punjab
Multan Sun Temple, an ancient Hindu sun temple
Multan Khurd, a town in Talagang Tehsil, Punjab

Iran 
 Multan, Iran, a village in Sistan and Baluchistan Province, Iran

Sports 
 Multan Tigers, a cricket team in the Faysal Bank T20 Cup

Ship 
RMS Mooltan, ship named after the city of Multan

See also